Loes Adegeest (born 7 August 1996) is a Dutch racing cyclist and former speed skater. As a cyclist, she currently rides for  after riding for Irish IBCT team, and the Dutch amateur team Jan van Arckel and  Parkhotel Valkenburg. On 26 February 2022, Adegeest won the women's race at the 2022 UCI Cycling Esports World Championships representing e-racing team Aeonian Race Team. In January of 2023 she won her first UCI Women's World Tour race, the Cadel Evans Great Ocean Road Race. In february of 2023 she prolongued her title as UCI Cycling Esports World Champion.

Major results
2022
 1st  UCI Esports World Championships
 4th Dwars door het Hageland
 4th Time trial, National Road Championships
 5th Overall Belgium Tour
1st  Mountains classification
2023
 1st  UCI Esports World Championships
 1st Cadel Evans Great Ocean Road Race

References

External links

1996 births
Living people
Dutch female cyclists
Dutch female speed skaters
21st-century Dutch women
20th-century Dutch women
20th-century Dutch people
People from Dalfsen
Cyclists from Overijssel